Not to be confused with the ritual named Rajasuya.

Rajasuya Yaaga (Kannada: ರಾಜಸೂಯ ಯಾಗ) is a 1937 Indian Kannada film, directed by T. Dwarakanath and produced by Timmiah. The film stars S. R. Vasudevarao, T. K. Ramamurhty, K. R. Seetharama Sastry and T. Jayamma in the lead roles. The film has musical score by H. R. Padmanabha Shashtri.

Cast
S. R. Vasudevarao
T. K. Ramamurhty
K. R. Seetharama Sastry
T. Jayamma
T. Chandrashekar
E. V. Saroja
K. V. Achuta Rao

References

1930s Kannada-language films
Indian black-and-white films